Þorgerður Katrín Gunnarsdóttir (born 4 October 1965) is an Icelandic politician, who has been chairman of the Reform Party since 2017.

Þorgerður was deputy chairwoman of the Independence Party from 2005 to 2010. She was the Minister of Education, Science and Culture from 31 December 2003 to 1 February 2009. From 2006, Þorgerður served as acting Prime Minister in the absence of Geir Haarde, including during his 2009 cancer treatment. She left the Independence Party in 2016 and joined the newly founded Reform Party and became its chairman the following year. She was Minister of Fisheries and Agriculture in 2017.

Family 
Her father was Gunnar Eyjólfsson, an actor, who was born on 24 February 1926 and died on 21 November 2016. Her husband is Kristján Arason who was CEO of Retail Banking at Kaupthing Bank and previously one of Iceland's most successful handball players. Þorgerður Katrín and Kristján have three children, Gunnar Ari (1995), Gísli Þorgeir (1999) and Katrín Erla (2003).

At the time of the Icelandic financial crisis her husband owed Kaupthing bank just under 900 million ISK which he had borrowed to purchase shares in the bank. The debt was never repaid, as the board of Kaupthing allowed their executives to transfer their loans and shares into private holding companies a few months before the bank was taken over by the Icelandic authorities. These companies subsequently defaulted.

Education 
Þorgerður Katrín took stúdentspróf from Menntaskólanum við Sund in Reykjavík 1985. In her final year she was elected Chairman (Ármaður) of the School Association as the second woman to serve in this position. She subsequently studied law at the University of Iceland and served as a board member in Orator, the Law Students' Society.

Business career 
After graduating with a Master of Law degree in 1993 Þorgerður Katrín began her career as a solicitor in a law firm at Höfðabakki. From 1997 to 1999 she was director of the Social and Current Affairs Department at the National Broadcasting Service. She worked for the Icelandic Chamber of Commerce during her break from politics 2013 to 2016.

Political career 
During her time at university she served as a board member in Stefnir, the local Independence Party youth organization in Hafnarfjörður, and vice-president of the executive committee of the Board of Representatives of the Independence Party in Hafnarfjörður.

She was elected to the Althing in 1999 for the constituency of Reykjanes and from 2003 (when the Reykjanes constituency was abolished) for the Southwest constituency.

Þorgerður Katrín was Minister of Education in Geir Haarde's government from 2003 to 2009 and functioned as de facto Prime Minister during the crash due to his illness. She served as deputy chairman of the Independence Party 2005 to 2010. Þorgerður Katrín resigned as deputy chairman on 17 April 2010 after being criticised for the handling of her and her husband Kristján Arason's debts in Kaupthing Bank, which collapsed in October 2008. She subsequently took leave of absence from parliament and chose not to run for reelection in the 2013 election.

She joined the Reform Party shortly after it was founded in 2016 and was elected to the Althing for them in the 2016 election. Þorgerður Katrín subsequently became Minister of Fisheries and Agriculture in the short-lived government of Bjarni Benediksson. During the 2017 election campaign her party fell below the threshold in multiple polls and its founder Benedikt Jóhannesson therefore decided to step down as chairman in favour of Þorgerður.

References

External links
A biography at Althingi

Thorgerour Katrin Gunnarsdottir
Thorgerour Katrin Gunnarsdottir
1965 births
Living people
Thorgerour Katrin Gunnarsdottir
Thorgerour Katrin Gunnarsdottir
Thorgerour Katrin Gunnarsdottir
Thorgerour Katrin Gunnarsdottir